Hanna Ihedioha (born 9 July 1997 in Dingolfing) is a German snowboarder.

She participated at the FIS Freestyle Ski and Snowboarding World Championships 2019, winning a medal.

References

External links 
 

1997 births
Living people
German female snowboarders
21st-century German women